Maria Branyas Morera (born 4 March 1907) is an American-born Spanish supercentenarian. Aged , she has been the world's oldest verified living person since the death of Lucile Randon on 17 January 2023.

Early years

Branyas was born on 4 March 1907 in San Francisco, California, to an expatriate Spanish family (of Catalan origin) that had moved to the United States in 1906, the year before she was born. They later moved to Texas and New Orleans, where her father, Josep, who worked as a journalist, founded the Spanish-language magazine Mercurio. After he went bankrupt, and following a doctor's recommendation amid his declining health, the family decided to return to Catalonia in 1915. Because of the German naval presence in the Atlantic Ocean during the First World War, their boat had to travel via Cuba and the Azores to ensure safe passage. Playing with her brothers, Branyas fell from the upper deck to the lower deck, losing her hearing in one ear. Branyas's father died of tuberculosis on the voyage, and her mother later remarried. The family settled first in Barcelona and subsequently moved to Banyoles.

Later life

In July 1931, Branyas married Joan Moret, a doctor specialising in traumatology, with whom she had three children. She worked at his side as a nurse during the Spanish Civil War, working at a Nationalist field hospital in Trujillo, Extremadura. 

They later lived in Girona. Branyas worked as a nurse and her husband's assistant. He died of a heart attack in 1976.

In the 1990s, already in her 80s, Branyas travelled to Egypt, Italy, the Netherlands, and England, and took up sewing, music and reading. She has 11 grandchildren, and she outlived her eldest son, August, who died in a tractor accident at the age of 86.

Health and longevity
In 2000, at the age of 93, she moved to a nursing home in Olot, Catalonia, after contracting pneumonia. Until her mobility deteriorated, she was an active resident, playing the piano and exercising gymnastics. She leads a quiet and simple life, and rarely leaves her room. She has never smoked, drank alcohol, or dieted, and attributes her health to good genes. Branyas played the piano until she was 108. She is hard of hearing and uses a voice-to-text platform to communicate.

In March 2020, Branyas became the then-oldest person to recover from COVID-19. In an interview with The Observer, she called for better treatment of the elderly: "This pandemic has revealed that older people are the forgotten ones of our society. They fought their whole lives, sacrificed time and their dreams for today's quality of life. They didn't deserve to leave the world in this way".

In July 2020, a Catalan research study into the impact of the coronavirus pandemic on elderly care home residents, led by the Spanish National Research Council and Dalt Pharmacy, was called Proyecto Branyas in her honour.

After the death of Lucile Randon of France, on 17 January 2023, Branyas became the oldest living person in the world.

See also
 List of American supercentenarians
 List of Spanish supercentenarians
 List of European supercentenarians
 List of the verified oldest people
 Oldest people

Notes

References 

1907 births
American emigrants to Spain
American people of Catalan descent
American supercentenarians
Living people
People from Olot
People from San Francisco
Spanish centenarians
Spanish people of Catalan descent
Women supercentenarians